Live Phish 12.01.95 is a live album by the American rock band Phish. The album was originally released in MP3, FLAC and CD formats on March 20, 2007, and features the band's performance from December 1, 1995 at the Hersheypark Arena in Hershey, Pennsylvania in its entirety.

The concert’s opening two songs, “Buried Alive” and “Down With Disease,” are seminal records & the latter typifies the late-1995 sound, execution, and seamlessness that the band’s fans exalt. During "Wolfman's Brother,” singer and guitarist Trey Anastasio flubbed the lyrics to the song's bridge, and remarked that, since he likes them so much, he would sing them again. The narration during "Fly Famous Mockingbird" referenced the "Land of Chocolate,” which referred to both the town's association with The Hershey Company and a sequence from the Simpsons episode "Burns Verkaufen der Kraftwerk". The song "Catapult" was started over the hi-hat intro normally used for "David Bowie.” "David Bowie" also featured quotes of Homer Simpson (“mmmm... chocolate”) and a Simpsons musical quote. This was also the first time ever that "Mike’s Song" and "Weekapaug Groove" were played without another song in between them.

Track listing

Disc 1
 "Buried Alive" (Anastasio) - 3:19
 "Down With Disease" (Anastasio, Marshall) - 7:23
 "Theme From the Bottom" (Anastasio, Fishman, Gordon, Marshall, McConnell) - 9:42
 "Poor Heart" (Gordon) - 2:23
 "Wolfman's Brother" (Anastasio, Fishman, Gordon, Marshall, McConnell) - 5:27
 "Chalk Dust Torture" (Anastasio, Marshall) - 7:09
 "Colonel Forbin's Ascent" (Anastasio) - 5:23
 "Fly Famous Mockingbird" (Anastasio) - 11:22
 "Stash" (Anastasio, Marshall) - 13:50
 "Cavern" (Anastasio, Herman, Marshall) - 4:47

Disc 2
 "Halley's Comet" (Wright) - 6:32
 "Mike's Song" (Gordon) - 20:16
 "Weekapaug Groove" (Anastasio, Fishman, Gordon, McConnell) - 9:39
 "The Mango Song" (Anastasio) - 7:12
 "Wilson" (Anastasio, Marshall, Woolf) - 5:04
 "Suspicious Minds/Hold Your Head Up" (Argent, James, White) - 6:07
 "David Bowie/Catapult/David Bowie" (Anastasio, Gordon) - 15:06
 "Suzy Greenberg" (Anastasio, Pollak) - 6:38

Personnel
Trey Anastasio – guitars, lead vocals, narration on "Fly Famous Mockingbird"
Page McConnell – piano, organ, backing vocals
Mike Gordon – bass, backing vocals, lead vocals on "Mike's Song" and "Catapult"
Jon Fishman – drums, backing vocals, lead vocals on "Suspicious Minds"

External links 
 Phish.com - Official Site
 LivePhish.com - 12.01.95
 Phish.net - December 01, 1995

2007 albums
Phish live albums